The Ontario Curling Tour is a group of curling bonspiels, which takes places in Ontario, Canada and attracts some of the top male and female curlers in the province, and from across the country and world. The OCT was designed to promote competitive curling from a grass root level.

The events for the Ontario Curling Tour begin at the end of August and typically run until December, with occasional events taking place in January. Several of the events on the Ontario Curling Tour are also included in the World Curling Tour. All events on the Ontario Curling Tour, much like those on World Curling Tour, contain a prize purse for the winning teams, and award CTRS (Canadian Team Ranking System) points to the Canadian teams competing. CTRS points qualify teams for the Canadian Olympic Curling Trials and events such as the Canada Cup of Curling.

Men's events

Events in bold are part of the World Curling Tour

Women's events

Events in bold are part of the World Curling Tour

See also
List of teams on the Ontario Curling Tour
World Curling Tour

External links

References

 
Curling tours
World Curling Tour
Curling in Ontario